Palmer Creek is a stream in the U.S. state of Georgia. It is a tributary to the Etowah River.

Palmer Creek derives its name from Silas Palmour, a pioneer citizen of Native American (Indian) descent. A variant name is "Palmers Creek".

References

Rivers of Georgia (U.S. state)
Rivers of Dawson County, Georgia